Leukocyte immunoglobulin-like receptor subfamily A member 2 (LILRA2, CD85H, ILT1) is a protein that in humans is encoded by the LILRA2 gene.

Leukocyte Ig-like receptors (LIRs) are a family of immunoreceptors expressed predominantly on monocytes and B cells and at lower levels on dendritic cells and natural killer (NK) cells. All LIRs in subfamily B have an inhibitory function (see, e.g., LILRB1, MIM 604811). LIRs in subfamily A, with short cytoplasmic domains lacking an immunoreceptor tyrosine-based inhibitory motif (ITIM) and with transmembrane regions containing a charged arginine residue, may initiate stimulatory cascades. One member of subfamily A (LILRA3; MIM 604818) lacks a transmembrane region and is presumed to be a soluble receptor.[supplied by OMIM]

Function 
LILRA2 senses microbially cleaved immunoglobulin to activate human myeloid cells.

See also
 Cluster of differentiation

References

Further reading

External links
 
 PDBe-KB provides an overview of all the structure information available in the PDB for Human Leukocyte immunoglobulin-like receptor subfamily A member 2 (LILRA2)

Clusters of differentiation
Immunoglobulin superfamily